Amoaku Ogyadu Obuadabang Larbi (born 16 June 1948) is a Ghanaian politician and member of the first parliament of the 4th Republic of Ghana. He represented Ayensuano Constituency in the Eastern Region of Ghana.

Early life and education 
Amoaku Ogyadu Obuadabang Larbi was born on the 16th of June 1948 in the eastern Region of Ghana. He attained his GCE Ordinary Level at Apam Secondary School.

Politics 
Amoaku Ogyadu Obuadabang Larbi was elected member of the first parliament to represent Ayensuano constituency in the 1992 Ghanaian Parliamentary Elections under the membership of the National Democratic Congress and he assumed office on the 7th of January 1993.

References 

Living people
Ghanaian MPs 1993–1997
1948 births
National Democratic Congress (Ghana) politicians
People from Eastern Region (Ghana)